Wu Jiayi (born 1 December 1995) is a Chinese actress.

Career
In 2016, Wu made her small-screen debut in the period romance television series Demon Girl. The same year, she was cast in the shenmo television series Zhaoge, playing Yi Jiang.

In 2017, Wu was cast in her first leading role in the shenmo television series Legend of Nezha, portraying Xiao Longnu.

In 2018, Wu starred in the historical romance drama Untouchable Lovers.

In 2019, Wu gained recognition after starring in fantasy drama Novoland: Eagle Flag as a bold and cheerful princess, and in  youth military drama Arsenal Military Academy where she played a spoilt actress.

In 2020, Wu played leading roles in the shenmo drama Heroic Journey of Nezha, as well as palace drama Love Story of Court Enemies; and historical fantasy drama Dance of the Sky Empire.

Filmography

Film

Television series

Discography

Awards

References

1995 births
Living people
Central Academy of Drama alumni
21st-century Chinese actresses
Chinese television actresses